"St. Thomas" is among the most recognizable instrumentals in the repertoire of American jazz tenor saxophonist Sonny Rollins. Although Rollins is commonly credited as its composer, the tune is based on the traditional Bahamian folksong "Sponger Money" and the traditional English song "The Lincolnshire Poacher". By way of the folk process, "The Lincolnshire Poacher" evolved into a nursery song in the Virgin Islands, which Rollins' mother sang to him when he was a child.

"St. Thomas" became popular when it was released on Rollins's 1956 album Saxophone Colossus, though it had been recorded by Randy Weston in 1955 under the title "Fire Down There", on his Get Happy album.

The tune is featured as background for the Trask wedding scene in the 1988 film "Working Girl".

The tune also featured in the soundtrack of the Grand Theft Auto IV video game on the fictitious radio station "Jazz Nation Radio".

Selected discography 
 Alone Together, Ron Carter and Jim Hall (1972) (St. Thomas arranged for acoustic bass and guitar)
 Where There's Smoke, Dallas Original Jazz Orchestra (2009) (St. Thomas arranged for big band in 1976 by Gene Glover)

References 

1950s jazz standards
Sonny Rollins songs
Jazz compositions in C major